Mebarak is a surname. Notable people with the surname include:

 Shakira Mebarak (born 1977), Colombian singer-songwriter
 Jade Mebarak, fictional character on the Telemundo television series El Clon

See also
 Mubarak (name)